Chabad affiliated organizations and institutions number in the thousands. Chabad is a Hasidic movement, a branch of Orthodox Judaism. The organizations and institutions associated with the movement provide social, educational and religious services to Jews around the globe.

Chabad organizations 
Chabad organizations include individual organizations, central and umbrella organizations, and independent organizations.

Chabad's central organization representing the movement at large, Agudas Chasidei Chabad, is headed by Rabbi Avraham Shemtov. The educational and outreach arm, Merkos L'Inyonei Chinuch, is headed by Rabbi Yehuda Krinsky. Other central organizations include Lubavitch Youth Organization and Mahane Israel.

Local Chabad centers and institutions are often incorporated as separate legal entities.

Agudas Chasidei Chabad 

Agudas Chassidei Chabad (Union of Chabad Chasidim or Association of Chabad Chassidim also known by its initials "Aguch") is the umbrella organization for the worldwide Chabad-Lubavitch movement. Aguch oversees the other Chabad central organizations such as Machneh Israel and Merkos L'Inyonei Chinuch. The chairman of the Executive Committee is Rabbi Abraham Shemtov.

The organization's divisions include:
Library of Agudas Chassidei Chabad – Chabad's main library housing its book and manuscript collection and historical archives.

Merkos L'Inyonei Chinuch 

Merkos L'Inyonei Chinuch – Founded in 1942, Merkos, as it is commonly known, is Chabad's educational arm, with several divisions:
Kehot Publication Society – Chabad's main publishing house.
Central Chabad Lubavitch Library – The movement's main library, which houses its manuscript collection and other Jewish works.
Chabad.org – Chabad's main website; it includes thousands of articles and Jewish multimedia.
Office of Education (Chabad) – A center for educators and parents.
National Committee for the Furtherance of Jewish Education (NCFJE) – The NCFJE runs several summer camps and other Jewish educational programs including released time.
Jewish Learning Institute (JLI) – JLI provides Jewish education classes for adults and teens.
Jewish Learning Network ("jnet") – "jnet" provides a service matching Jewish adults who wish to study Jewish topics with volunteers who offer tutoring over the phone.
The Shluchim Office – A resource center for Shluchim, Chabad's emissaries.
Jewish Educational Media (JEM) – JEM houses the movement's audio and video collection.
The Shluchim Exchange – An online social network for Shluchim, Chabad's emissaries.

Machneh Israel 

Machneh Israel – Founded in 1942, Mahane Israel acts as Chabad's social service agency, with several divisions:
Collel Chabad – Originally established by Rabbi Shneur Zalman of Liadi, Collel Chabad is one of the oldest Jewish charities operating today.
Machneh Israel Development Fund (MIDF) – MIDF is a fund dedicated to the growth of Jewish life worldwide.
Tzivos Hashem: Jewish Children International – Tzivot Hashem provides educational activities for Jewish children under Bar/Bat Mitzvah (ages 12–13).
Keren Hachomesh Charitable Foundation – A charitable foundation founded in 1988, after the death of Chaya Mushka Schneerson, the wife of Rabbi Menachem Mendel Schneerson.
Keren Mamosh Charitable Foundation – A charitable foundation.
Taharas Hamishpocho International – Founded in 1975, the organization provides educational resources pertaining to Jewish family purity.
N'shei Chabad – The movement's central women's organization.

Affiliated organizations 
Other organizations affiliated with the movement include:
Tomchei Temimim – The central organization administering Chabad yeshivas. Founded in 1897, Tomchei Temimim is older than Agudas Chasidei Chabad, but nevertheless is overseen by it as are all central chabad institutions.
Vaad Talmidei Hatmimim Haolami –  The central student organization serving the worldwide Chabad Lubavitch Yeshiva network. Founded in 2001, the Vaad is under the auspices of the Yeshiva faculty.
Federation of Jewish Communities of Russia and Federation of Jewish Communities of the CIS – The central organizations representing Russian Jewry. These organizations are run by Chabad emissaries and their supporters, however, the organizations are not overseen by Agudas Chasidei Chabad.
Menachem Education Foundation (MEF)
Friendship Circle - charity for children and young people with special needs
 Chabad Teen Network or CTeen is a global family of Jewish teens, dedicated to changing the world through acts of goodness and kindness. Through a fusion of fun, friendship building events, humanitarian outreach, mitzvah observance, and engaging Torah study, teens are empowered to actualize their inner infinite potential, while cultivating a strong sense of Jewish identity, pride, mission, and love of G‑d.

Chabad institutions 
As of 2023 there are 3,500 Chabad institutions around the world. As of 2023 there were 5000 Chabad centers in 100 countries.

This number of Chabad institutions includes schools and other Chabad-affiliated establishments. The number of Chabad centers vary per country; the majority are in the United States and Israel (see table). There are over 40 countries which have a small Chabad presence (not listed in the table). In total, according to its directory, Chabad maintains a presence in 950 cities around the world: 178 in Europe, 14 in Africa, 200 in Israel, 400 in North America, 38 in South America, and about 70 in Asia (excluding Israel, including Russia).

Chabad institutions by geographic region

Chabad institutions are spread throughout the globe, with the largest concentration being in the United States.

Chabad institutions in Europe
There are 465 Chabad institutions in Europe. The majority are in France, Russia, Ukraine and the United Kingdom.

Chabad institutions in Asia
There are 616 Chabad institutions in Asia. The majority are in Israel.

Chabad institutions in Oceania
There are 67 Chabad institutions in Oceania. The majority are in Australia.

Chabad institutions in Africa
There are 27 Chabad institutions in Africa. The majority are in South Africa.

Chabad institutions in North America
There are 1,174 Chabad institutions in North America. The majority are in Canada and the United States.

Chabad institutions in South America
There are 81 Chabad institutions in South America. The majority are in Brazil and Argentina.

Chabad Houses 
A Chabad House is a form of Jewish community center, primarily serving both educational and observance purposes. Often, until the community can support its own center, the Chabad House is located in the shaliach's home, with the living room being used as the "synagogue". Effort is made to provide an atmosphere in which the nonobservant will not feel intimidated by any perceived contrast between their lack of knowledge of Jewish practice and the advanced knowledge of some of the people they meet there. The term "Chabad House" originated with the creation of the first such outreach center on the campus of UCLA by Rabbi Shlomo Cunin.

In the 2008 Mumbai attacks, the local Chabad House was targeted. The local Chabad emissaries, Rabbi Gavriel Holtzberg and his wife Rivka, and four other Jews were brutally murdered. Chabad received condolences from around the world.

Fundraising 
Funds for activities of a Chabad center rely entirely on the local community. Chabad centers do not receive funding from Lubavitch headquarters. For the day-to-day operations, local emissaries do all the fundraising by themselves.

Chabad emissaries often solicit the support of local Jews. Funds are used toward purchasing or renovating Chabad centers, synagogues and Mikvahs.

References

Chabad-Lubavitch (Hasidic dynasty)